The Winsløw family is a Danish family.

History
The earliest known male family member is a Hans Moritzen in Kolding. His son, Jacob Hansen (1605-51), served as parish priest in Winslöf and Neflinge in Scania, then part of Denmark, where the family name comes from.

Notable members
 Jacob B. Winsløw (1669 – 1760), anatomist
 Peter Christian Winsløw ((1708- c. 1756)), medal engraver
 Frederik Christian Winsløw (1752-1811), surgeon
 Carl Winsløw (1796-1834), actor
 Carl Winsløw (1852-1941), engineer
 Anna Henriette Winsløw (1859-1913), actress
  Elith Pio (1887-1983), actor
 Laurits "Lasse" Winsløw Nielsen (1911–2006), painter

References

 
Danish families